Mark Bett Kipkinyor (born 22 December 1976) is a Kenyan long-distance runner who specializes in the 3000 and 5000 metres. His time over 5000 m of 12:58.72 minutes in 2001, achieved in Zürich, was the third best time in the world that season, only behind Richard Limo and Hailu Mekonnen.

Achievements

Personal bests
3000 metres - 7:36.66 min (2001)
5000 metres - 12:55.63 min (2000)
10,000 metres - 26:52.93 min (2005)
Half marathon - 1:02:54 hrs (2006)
10,000 metres - world record holder- indoor

External links

1976 births
Living people
Kenyan male long-distance runners
Kenyan male cross country runners
20th-century Kenyan people
21st-century Kenyan people